Saosin, also known as “the beetle album”, is the debut full-length studio album by American rock band Saosin, released September 26, 2006 through Capitol Records.  It is the band's second release to feature lead vocalist Cove Reber. The album is best known for its lead riffs with delays and natural harmonics as a form of creating melodies. The guitar riffs on the album were listed on Alternative Press's "Best Guitar Riffs of 2000s Rock." The first single, "Voices" was listed on the Top 46 post-hardcore songs of the 2000s, and the second single, "You're Not Alone" was listed on the Top 10 Essential Emo Power Ballads by the Alternative Press.

Release

A limited edition version of the album was also released and included a behind the scenes look into the making of the album as well as music videos of "Bury Your Head" (Saosin EP version) and "Lost Symphonies" (a song first included on the 2003 Translating the Name EP). The album has currently sold an estimated 800,000 copies worldwide.

Track listing

All lyrics written by Cove Reber and Beau Burchell. All music composed by Saosin.

Use in popular media
 2007 KROQ New ROQ (2006) – "Voices"
 The Best of Taste of Chaos Two (2007) – "Follow and Feel"
 ATV Offroad Fury Pro (2007) - "Sleepers"
 Burnout Dominator (2007) - "Collapse"
 Saw IV: Original Motion Picture Soundtrack (2007) – "Collapse"
 Reef: Bobby Martinez Mixed Tape (2007) – "It's Far Better to Learn"
 MX vs. ATV: Untamed (2007) - "Collapse"
 Burnout Paradise (2008) - "Collapse"

Personnel
Saosin album personnel as listed on Allmusic.

Saosin
Cove Reber - lead vocals, piano
Justin Shekoski - lead guitar, backing vocals
Beau Burchell - rhythm guitar, keyboard, piano, programming, backing vocals
Chris Sorenson - bass guitar, backing vocals, additional keyboards
Alex Rodriguez - drums, percussion

Additional musicians
Howard Benson - additional keyboards/programming

Artwork
Martin Kvamme - graphic design

Production
Howard Benson - producer
Beau Burchell - producer
Louie Bandak & Ron Laffitte - A&R
Paul DeCarli - digital editing
Hatsukazu "Hatch" Inagaki - assistant engineer
Ted Jensen - mastering
Chris Lord-Alge - mixing
Jon Nicholson - drum technician
Mike Plotnikoff - engineer
Arthur Spivak - management
Marc VanGool - guitar technician
Wiley Gutchell - bass technician

Charts

References
 Citations

Sources

 

Saosin albums
2006 debut albums
Capitol Records albums
Albums produced by Howard Benson